The Agulhas long-billed lark (Certhilauda brevirostris), also known as the Agulhas lark or Agulhas longbill is a small passerine bird. It is an endemic resident breeder in the Western Cape, South Africa.

Taxonomy and systematics
This lark was formerly considered as a subspecies of the Cape long-billed lark, as Certhilauda curvirostris brevirostris until it and three other subspecies were elevated to species status (Sibley and Monroe 1990, 1993). The Handbook of the Birds of the World re-lumped the species in with the Cape long-billed lark in 2017. Clements has also lumped both together.

Description
It is long-tailed and has a longish curved bill. It has a streaked buff-grey head and back, and the closed wings are grey. The underparts are cream-coloured with dark streaking on the breast and flanks. Compared to Cape long-billed lark, this species has more buff colour and has a shorter tail and bill.

The display song of Agulhas long-billed lark is a disyllabic whistle "seeooo seeeooo".

Distribution and habitat
The natural habitat of Agulhas long-billed lark is uncertain, since most of its range has been converted into stony wheatfields and pasture land, only 30% remaining as coastal fynbos or karoo scrub. It is endemic to South Africa. However, it appears to have adapted quite well to its modified habitats, like farmlands, although its distribution is patchy for unknown reasons.

Behaviour and ecology
At present, very little is known about its ecology and breeding requirements. Like other larks, it nests on the ground. Its food is seeds and insects, the latter especially in the breeding season.

References

Sinclair, Hockey and Tarboton, SASOL Birds of Southern Africa,  
Sibley, C. G. and Monroe, B. L. (1990) Distribution and taxonomy of birds of the world. New Haven, USA: Yale University Press. , 
Sibley, C. G. and Monroe, B. L. (1993) A supplement to Distribution and taxonomy of birds of the world. New Haven, USA: Yale University Press.
BirdLife International

Agulhas long-billed lark
Endemic birds of South Africa
Agulhas long-billed lark